"My Hula Hula Love" is a song with words by Edward Madden and music by Percy Wenrich published in 1911.  It was adapted and retitled "Hula Love" by Buddy Knox in 1957 and performed by Knox with The Rhythm Orchids. The song was featured on his 1959 album, Buddy Knox.

Chart performance
It reached #9 on the U.S. and #13 on the U.S. R&B chart in 1957.

Popular culture
Buddy Knox sang the song in the 1957 film Jamboree.

Other versions
Bob Lenox released a version of the song on a 1957 various artist's EP.
Peter Kraus featuring Werner Müller and His Orchestra released a version of the song in German as the B-side to his 1958 single "Rosmarie" and it reached #1 in Germany.
Hank Snow released a version of the song as a single in 1966, but it did not chart.
Mud released a version of the song as a single in 1975 reaching #38 in Germany.
Amos Garrett released a version of the song on his 1980 album Go Cat Go.
Pearl Harbour released a version of the song as a single in 1984, but it did not chart.

References

1957 songs
1957 singles
1966 singles
1975 singles
1984 singles
Buddy Knox songs
Mud (band) songs
Song recordings produced by Chet Atkins
Song recordings produced by Mike Chapman
Song recordings produced by Richard Gottehrer
Number-one singles in Germany
Roulette Records singles
RCA Victor singles
RAK Records singles
Island Records singles